The knockout stage of the Copa América Centenario began on 16 June and ended on 26 June 2016 with the final at the MetLife Stadium in East Rutherford, New Jersey. All times are EDT (UTC−4).

Qualified teams
The top two placed teams from each of the four groups qualified for the knockout stage.

Bracket

Quarter-finals

United States vs Ecuador

Peru vs Colombia

Argentina vs Venezuela

Mexico vs Chile

Semi-finals

United States vs Argentina

Colombia vs Chile
Due to heavy thunderstorms in the Chicago area which arrived shortly after the first half ended, the start of the second half of the match was delayed by over two hours.

Third place play-off

Final

References

External links
Copa América Centenario official website

Knockout stage
2016 in American soccer
2016 in Ecuadorian football

2016 in Colombian football
2016 in Argentine football

2015–16 in Mexican football
2015–16 in Chilean football